Frank McGrellis (born 5 October 1958) is a Scottish football player and coach. He played for Coventry City, Huddersfield Town and Hereford United in England and Wits University in South Africa before playing and coaching at state level in Australia.

Playing career
McGrellis was born in Falkirk, Scotland, on 5 October 1958. He began his senior career in England, signing for Coventry City as an apprentice before turning professional in October 1976, but didn't make any first team appearances. He was loaned to Huddersfield Town in October 1978 before a permanent transfer to Hereford United in March 1979. He made 85 Football League appearances for Hereford, scoring 24 goals, before going on to play abroad for Wits University in South Africa and Brunswick Juventus in Australia.

Management career
McGrellis' coaching career has mainly been with state league clubs in Victoria, Australia, including Altona Magic SC in the Eat Well Live Well Premier League during 2001, and later Southern Stars FC.

References

1958 births
Living people
Footballers from Falkirk
Association football forwards
Scottish footballers
Scottish expatriate sportspeople in South Africa
Expatriate soccer players in South Africa
English Football League players
National Soccer League (Australia) players
Brunswick Juventus players
Coventry City F.C. players
Hereford United F.C. players
Huddersfield Town A.F.C. players
Bidvest Wits F.C. players
Scottish football managers
Scottish expatriate football managers
Scottish expatriate sportspeople in Australia
Expatriate soccer managers in Australia
Expatriate soccer players in Australia